The mixed doubles table tennis event was part of the table tennis programme and took place between September 29 and October 3, at the Suwon Gymnasium.

Schedule
All times are Korea Standard Time (UTC+09:00)

Results
Legend
WO — Won by walkover

Finals

Top half

Section 1

Section 2

Section 3

Section 4

Bottom half

Section 5

Section 6

Section 7

Section 8

References

 incheon2014ag.org

External links
Official website

Table tennis at the 2014 Asian Games